Jerry Ray Watford (December 19, 1930 – March 10, 1993) was an American football player who played two seasons with the Chicago Cardinals of the National Football League. He was drafted by the Chicago Cardinals in the eighth round of the 1953 NFL Draft. He played college football at the University of Alabama and attended Gadsden High School in Gadsden, Alabama.

References

External links
Just Sports Stats

1930 births
1993 deaths
Players of American football from Alabama
American football offensive guards
American football ends
Alabama Crimson Tide football players
Chicago Cardinals players
Sportspeople from Gadsden, Alabama